

Gmina Siechnice is an urban-rural gmina (administrative district) in Wrocław County, Lower Silesian Voivodeship, in south-western Poland. It is part of the Wrocław metropolitan area.

Until 1 January 2010 the gmina was called Gmina Święta Katarzyna, and had its seat in the village of Święta Katarzyna, which is just to the west of Siechnice. (Now the only urban-rural gmina in Poland to have its seat in a village rather than its town is Gmina Nowe Skalmierzyce.)

Neighbouring gminas
Gmina Siechnice is bordered by the city of Wrocław and by the gminas of Czernica, Domaniów, Kobierzyce, Oława and Żórawina.

Villages
Apart from the town of Siechnice, the gmina contains the villages of Biestrzyków, Blizanowice, Bogusławice, Durok, Groblice, Grodziszów, Iwiny, Kotowice, Łukaszowice, Mokry Dwór, Ozorzyce, Radomierzyce, Radwanice, Smardzów, Sulęcin, Sulimów, Święta Katarzyna, Szostakowice, Trestno, Zacharzyce, Zębice and Żerniki Wrocławskie.

References

Siechnice
Gmina Siechnice